Nine Mile Point Nuclear Station is a nuclear power plant with two nuclear reactors located in the town of Scriba, approximately five miles northeast of Oswego, New York, on the shore of Lake Ontario. The  site is also occupied by the James A. FitzPatrick Nuclear Power Plant.

In April 2011, Exelon of Chicago announced its intention to purchase Constellation Energy, the owner and operator of Nine Mile Point Nuclear Station. The acquisition was approved by FERC and the companies officially combined on March 12, 2012 with Constellation Energy taking the Exelon name. Exelon separated its generating assets back into Constellation Energy in 2022. Constellation owns Unit 1 and holds (82%) of Unit 2 while Long Island Power Authority holds (18%). Constellation Energy is the sole operator of both Units 1 & 2. Both units are boiling water reactors (BWRs).

Units 1 and 2

Both units are General Electric boiling water reactors (BWR). It is the oldest operating commercial nuclear reactor still in service in the United States. Unit 2, a BWR-5, has been in operation since 1988 and has a rated capacity of 1,375 MW. Construction of both units, along with neighboring Fitzpatrick, was commissioned by Niagara Mohawk Power Corporation. Fitzpatrick was sold immediately upon completion, while Niagara Mohawk retained its share of the Nine Mile Point units until 2001, when it sold them to Constellation.

On October 31, 2006, Constellation announced that the NRC had granted 20-year license extensions to both units. Unit 1 is now licensed to operate until 2029 and Unit 2 is licensed until 2046.

The Nine Mile Point 2 cooling tower is 543 feet tall and is visible from Chimney Bluffs in Sodus, New York nearly 30 miles away. Nine Mile Point 1 draws cooling water  from Lake Ontario, and does not have a cooling tower.

In early May 2011, the plant operator reported that the plant fuel supplier, General Electric, notified the operator that mathematical errors could've resulted in the reactor's fuel getting hotter than expected.

In 2016, Governor of New York Andrew Cuomo directed the Public Service Commission to consider ratepayer-financed subsidies similar to those for renewable sources to keep nuclear power stations profitable in the competition against natural gas. Indian Point would not be included in the scheme.

Withdrawn unit 3 proposal
Unistar Nuclear, a joint venture between Constellation Energy and Électricité de France (EDF), announced in late 2008 that it had notified the U.S. Nuclear Regulatory Commission (NRC) of its plan to submit a combined construction and operating license (COL) application for a European Pressurized Reactor (EPR) at Constellation Energy's Nine Mile Point site. Less than a year later however, Unistar requested a temporary suspension of the application review, and in 2013, citing a lack of federal loan guarantees, withdrew the application completely.

Electricity Production

Surrounding population

The 2010 U.S. population within  of Nine Mile Point was 35,632, an increase of 17.0 percent in a decade, according to an analysis of U.S. Census data for msnbc.com. The 2010 U.S. population within  was 909,523, an increase of 3.2 percent since 2000. Cities within 50 miles include Syracuse (36 miles to city center).

1991 site area emergency
On August 13, 1991 a "site area emergency" was declared at the plant. According to Time magazine, this was the third occasion an SAE had been declared at a US nuclear plant.

The emergency was due to an electrical fault which caused a momentary loss of electrical power to the reactor and control room. The operators shut down the reactor in accordance with the emergency plan requirements. There were no injuries or release of radiation as a result of the incident. The reactor left emergency procedures about 13 hours after initiation.

From NRC Information Notice 91-64, Supplement 1:

The facility was operating at full power when a phase-to-ground electrical fault occurred on phase B of the Unit 2 main power transformer. This resulted in a trip of the main generator, main turbine, and reactor. The fault also caused the voltage on electrical distribution phase B buses to drop to about half of its nominal value for approximately 200 milliseconds, after which it returned to normal.

This momentary voltage drop resulted in the simultaneous loss of power output from each of the five Non-Class 1E uninterruptible power supplies. Exide's UPS units have internal continuously charged back-up batteries to prevent a loss of control logic power. Exide's UPS control logic circuitry receives, processes, generates, and sends electrical signals essential for proper UPS operation. However, in this incident the back-up power battery packs were apparently past their useful life and were completely discharged.

The loss of power from the UPS units caused a loss of all the following: the control room annunciators, the safety parameter display system computer, control rod position indication, the plant process computer, the core thermal limits computer, the feedwater control system, some of the lighting for the plant, the plant radio and paging systems, some instrumentation for balance-of-plant systems, and some instrument recorders.

The loss of control room annunciators concurrent with the plant transient resulting from automatic tripping of the main generator, main turbine, and reactor caused the licensee (Niagara Mohawk) to declare a site area emergency in accordance with the site emergency plan. The loss of control rod position indicators and other equipment losses burdened the operators in implementing the emergency procedures. However, the operators shut down the plant in accordance with emergency procedures. About 13 hours after the plant trip, the reactor was placed in a cold shutdown condition; and approximately 1 hour later, the licensee ended the site area emergency.

Seismic risk
The Nuclear Regulatory Commission's estimate of the risk each year of an earthquake intense enough to cause core damage to the reactor at Nine Mile Point was Reactor 1: 1 in 238,095; Reactor 2: 1 in 178,571, according to an NRC study published in August 2010.

See also

 Darlington Nuclear Generating Station — located on the opposite side of Lake Ontario
 New York energy law
 Nuclear Power 2010 Program
 Pickering Nuclear Generating Station — located on the opposite side of Lake Ontario
 R. E. Ginna Nuclear Power Plant — located 50 miles west on Lake Ontario near Rochester

Notes

External links
Exelon Nine Mile Point Page
NRC Nine Mile Point 1 Page
NRC Nine Mile Point 2 page

Energy infrastructure completed in 1969
Energy infrastructure completed in 1988
Nuclear power plants in New York (state)
Towers in New York (state)
Buildings and structures in Oswego County, New York
Exelon
Électricité de France